Eric Walker may refer to:

 Eric Walker (footballer) (born 1933), Scottish former footballer
 Eric Walker (RAF officer) (1896–1983), British World War I flying ace
 Eric A. Walker (engineer) (1910–1995),  president of Penn State University, 1956–1970
 Eric A. Walker (historian) (1886–1976), British historian
 Eric Sherbrooke Walker (1887–1976), hotelier and military officer
 Eric Walker (entertainer) (born 1970), music producer and former actor